Bernhard Bauer (born 10 October 1967 in Oberwössen) is a retired German alpine skier who competed in the 1994 Winter Olympics.

External links
 sports-reference.com
 

1967 births
Living people
German male alpine skiers
Olympic alpine skiers of Germany
Alpine skiers at the 1994 Winter Olympics
20th-century German people